Lee Keun-shik (Korean: 이근식, born 10 February 1946) is a South Korean politician.

Born in Goseong, South Gyeongsang, Lee studied law at Seoul National University. After passing the Civil Service Examination in 1971, he started his career at the Economic Planning Board (now as the Ministry of Economy and Finance). He served as the Mayor of Geoje, Deputy Governor of South Gyeongsang, Secretary to the President for Civil Affairs, Deputy Minister of Home Affairs and Minister of Interior. He was also the one-term Member of the National Assembly from 2004 to 2008.

Lee had received an honorary degree from Samarkand State Institute of Foreign Languages in Uzbekistan. On 8 March 2020, he was elected as the President of the Open Democratic Party. He resigned on 19 April following the party's poor performance in 2020 election.

Election results

General elections

References

External links 
 Lee Keun-shik on Twitter
 Lee Keun-shik on Facebook
 Lee Keun-shik on Blog

1946 births
Living people
South Korean politicians
Seoul National University alumni
People from South Gyeongsang Province